Runjić is a Croatian surname.

Notable people with the name include:

 Anđelko Runjić (1938–2015), Croatian politician, economist and diplomat
 Zdenko Runjić (1942–2004), Croatian songwriter

See also
 Runjići

Croatian surnames